Kapelica refers to the following places in Croatia:

 Kapelica, Istria County
 Kapelica, Bjelovar-Bilogora County